Final Fantasy Adventure, known in Japan as  or simply  and later released in Europe as Mystic Quest, is a Final Fantasy spinoff and the first game in the Mana series. Published by Square in 1991 on the Game Boy, it saw a North American re-release by Sunsoft in April 1998.

Originally developed under the name Gemma Knights, it features gameplay roughly similar to that of the original The Legend of Zelda, but with the addition of role-playing statistical elements. Along with Final Fantasy Mystic Quest, Final Fantasy Adventure was the first Final Fantasy game to be released in Europe. A remake, Sword of Mana, was released for the Game Boy Advance in 2003, changing the plot and many gameplay aspects. A second remake was released on mobile phones in Japan which improved the graphics and music of the original version. A third remake, Adventures of Mana, was released for iOS, Android, and PlayStation Vita on February 4, 2016.

The story follows the hero and the young heroine as they attempt to thwart the Dark Lord of Glaive and his sorcerer assistant, Julius, from destroying the Tree of Mana and dooming their world. The game was released with many familiar elements of the Final Fantasy series, such as Chocobos, but these were later changed to feature common enemies and the gameplay style of the Mana series.

Final Fantasy Adventure was met with generally positive reviews at the time of its release. Over the course of time, reviewers have considered it one of the best action adventure games on the Game Boy. The game also spawned an entirely new game series, called the Mana series, which became a successful video game role-playing franchise. Its sequel, Secret of Mana, was released in 1993.

Gameplay 
 
The gameplay is similar to the original The Legend of Zelda for the NES: the world is viewed from a top-down camera angle, it is divided up into many different squares that can fit on the screen, and the main character can move up, down, left, and right across the screen. The player can interact with individuals within towns by gathering information and buying or selling items and equipment. A variety of enemies can be battled on a field screen to gain experience, GP, and items. Within dungeon areas, a number of puzzles may be present and required to be solved in order for the player to advance. The player can also save at any point. A number of weapons can be found throughout the game to maneuver through obstacles such as cutting through trees and thorns.

The main character possesses several statistics, including hit points, power, and stamina, which can all increase upon gaining an experience level. Magic spells, which expend the character's MP, can be used to heal oneself or damage enemies. These spells can only be found in certain locations or obtained from other characters at specific plot intervals. In addition, the protagonist has a power gauge that affects his attack strength—the higher the gauge, the stronger his attack will be. The speed at which it fills is directly affected by the character's will level. The gauge will slowly fill up over time, but once the main character attacks, the gauge is emptied. When the gauge is completely filled up and the main character attacks with a weapon, he will perform a special attack.

One additional non-player character may occasionally accompany the main character in the story and can perform different activities to aid the main character in his quest. The game introduced the ability to kill townspeople, something that many Japanese role-playing video games of the time lacked.

Plot
The Hero (named by the player, officially called Sumo) is a prisoner of the Dark Lord. One day, the Hero's friend informs him of the Dark Lord's goals, and he urges him to seek a Knight named Bogard. As the Hero escapes imprisonment, he learns that the Dark Lord is seeking a key to the Mana Sanctuary in order to control the Mana Tree, an energy source that sustains life. The Hero is befriended by the Heroine (named by the player, officially called Fuji) who is also seeking Bogard. The two find Bogard, who recommends they seek out a man named Cibba. During their journey to meet him, the Heroine is kidnapped. With the aid of a mysterious man, she is later rescued by the Hero. When they meet Cibba, he plays a message left by the Heroine's mother, who reveals she is a descendant of the guardians of the Mana Tree and her pendant is the key to it. The mysterious man, upon discovering that the heroine holds the pendant, reveals himself to be Julius, the Dark Lord's advisor and kidnaps her. The Hero then attempts to rescue the Heroine, but he fails and is knocked off of Julius's airship. However, the Heroine gives the Hero the pendant just before he falls.

The Hero is then reunited with Amanda, an escapee from his prison, who steals the pendant in order to win her brother Lester's freedom. The mayor of Jadd, Davias, takes the pendant, but he transforms Lester into a parrot. The Hero and Amanda confront a Medusa for its tear, which will break the spell. They kill it, but Amanda is infected by the Medusa's attack, causing her to transform into one herself. The Hero reluctantly kills her, and uses her tears to break Lester's spell. Lester avenges Amanda's death by killing Davias, who reveals that he gave the pendant to the Dark Lord. The Hero confronts and defeats the Dark Lord; however, Hero discovers that the Heroine is under Julius' mind control and has opened the entrance to the Mana Tree. Julius reveals he is the last survivor of the Vandole Empire, the empire who attempted to control the Mana Tree years ago, and handily defeats the Hero.

Realizing he is powerless to defeat Julius, the Hero learns from Cibba about a powerful sword called Excalibur. Cibba helps him find the Excalibur only to find a rusty sword instead. He explains that the rusty sword is the Excalibur and would reveal its true strength to whoever it finds worthy. The Hero then raises Dime Tower to reach the Mana Sanctuary and meets a robot known as Marcie. After reaching the top, the tower begins to collapse and Marcie sacrifices himself by throwing the Hero across. After obtaining and passing the sword's trials, the Hero confronts and defeats Julius at the cost of the Mana Tree's life. The Mana Tree reveals that she is the Heroine's mother and before dying, asks the Heroine to succeed her current position. The Heroine agrees and bids farewell to the Hero as she becomes the next Mana Tree, and the Hero her guardian.

Development
Square trademarked Seiken Densetsu in 1987 intending to use it for a game project subtitled The Emergence of Excalibur, and led by Kazuhiko Aoki for the Famicom Disk System. According to early advertisements, the game would consist of an unprecedented five floppy disks, making it one of the largest titles developed for the Famicom up until that point. Although Square solicited pre-orders for the game, Kaoru Moriyama, a former Square employee, affirms that management canceled the ambitious project before it advanced beyond the early planning stages. In October 1987, customers who had placed orders were sent a letter informing them of the cancellation and had their purchases refunded. The letter also suggested to consider placing an order on another upcoming Square role-playing game in a similar vein: Final Fantasy.

After the release of the third Final Fantasy title in 1990, Square offered designer Koichi Ishii to direct a spin-off series game. It began development for the Game Boy under the working title Gemma Knights; eventually, Square revived the trademarked name and released the game as Seiken Densetsu: Final Fantasy Gaiden. It was later released in Europe as Mystic Quest. Ishii suggested the basis of the game's story, while scenario writer Yoshinori Kitase helped write the game's script. Ishii designed all of the characters himself, while Goro Ohashi was responsible for the development of the game system.

The Mana series, of which Final Fantasy Adventure was the first game,  was the result of Koichi Ishii's desire to create a fictional world. In Ishii's opinion, Mana is not a series of video games, but rather a world which is illustrated by and can be explored through video games. When working on the series, Koichi Ishii drew inspiration from abstract images from his memories of childhood, as well as movies and fantasy books that captivated him as a child. Ishii took care to avoid set conventions, and his influences are correspondingly very wide and non-specific. Nonetheless, among his literary influences, he acknowledges Tove Jansson's Moomin, Lewis Carroll's Alice's Adventures in Wonderland, and J. R. R. Tolkien's Lord of the Rings.

Music 

The  was released in Japan on July 15, 1991. Most of the tracks were composed by Kenji Ito, while track 16, "Chocobo Tanjou (Chocobo's Birth)", is credited to Square composer Nobuo Uematsu. , a set of arranged tracks was also released on September 30, 1991. Both albums were compiled into Seiken Densetsu: Final Fantasy Gaiden Sound Collections, originally released on August 18, 1995. The game's music was included in a 20th anniversary CD compilation of all of the Mana series games' soundtracks. A second arranged album titled  was released on December 10, 1998. The album was compiled by Yu Hong Ishikawa and Kushiro Negishi.

Versions and merchandise

In 1998, Sunsoft obtained the license for it and re-released it along with the Final Fantasy Legend games. This version was advertised as having Game Boy Color support, although the release was not enhanced in any way. RPGamer reported in July 2004 that Square was polling die-hard customers, testing the feasibility of porting Final Fantasy Adventure to the Nintendo DS. GamesRadar listed Final Fantasy Adventure as one of the titles they want in the 3DS Virtual Console.

The game received a remake for the Game Boy Advance called Sword of Mana in 2003. The original version was remade again to mobile phones and released on August 16, 2006 for SoftBank's 3G network. It was later ported onto i-Mode distribution service on November 6, 2006 and EZweb distribution service on February 5, 2007. The gameplay of the mobile phone version is closer to the original game's design, but featuring updated graphics and sound, an improved world map, and other minor changes. The characters have been redesigned several times between each remake. A 3D remake, Adventures of Mana, was released in 2016 for PlayStation Vita, Android and iOS. A port of the original game for the Nintendo Switch was released with ports of Secret of Mana and Trials of Mana as part of the Seiken Densetsu Collection on June 1, 2017 in Japan and on June 11, 2019 in North America and Europe as Collection of Mana.

The guidebooks were released in May 1991 and August 1991 respectively.

Other manga 
Final Fantasy Adventure,  is one of the video games featured in the manga titled Rock'n Game Boy, by Shigeto Ikehara and Published by Comic BomBom October 1989 to December 1991.

Reception 

According to Square's publicity department, the game sold 700,000 units worldwide, with 500,000 of these sold in Japan.

Final Fantasy Adventure was featured in Nintendo Power when it was re-released in the United States. IGN praised the Game Boy re-release version noting its strong story, graphics, and music. They additionally praised the game's puzzle elements as innovative and drew comparisons to The Legend of Zelda: Link's Awakening, though noted that its role-playing gameplay did not blend well with its action-oriented nature. RPGamer praised the game's plot stating, "The story is one where you can relate to the characters and also the world around them." Nintendojo also gave similar praise to the game however noting it being vastly different from Final Fantasy stating, "If you’re expecting Final Fantasy in the traditional sense, you’re going to be disappointed. However, if you play the game for a while, you just might find that it’s equally entertaining in its own fashion."

The game has been perceived very positively in the years following its initial release. GameDaily named it alongside the other Game Boy Final Fantasy titles as definitive games for the system, describing it as providing "hours of role-playing excitement, whether you were waiting in a dentist's office or on the way to Grandma's house." The sentiment was shared by gaming magazine Pocket Games, which ranked the titles together 8th out of the Top 50 games for the Game Boy, stating "every game in the series is a sprawling classic with well-written scripts and solid characters." Kotaku praised the original release of the game as a "really great action-RPG". 1UP.com called the game ambitious for its time, writing that it represented an evolution of the overhead perspective action adventure genre. They also rated the game as "Worth It!" in terms of buying and enjoying the original game in 2007, and noted it as the origins of the Mana series' many unique gameplay features. GamesRadar named it the 13th best Game Boy game ever made, noting that its interesting leveling system and a large number of collectible items made up for a poor English translation. Game Informer also praised the game's leveling system, though it did call it a "simplistic" title in comparison to its sequels.

References 
Translations

Citations

External links 
  

Role-playing video games
Final Fantasy video games
Sunsoft games
Action role-playing video games
Game Boy games
Mana (series) video games
Mobile games
1991 video games
Video games developed in Japan
Video games scored by Kenji Ito
Single-player video games
Nintendo Switch games

de:Seiken Densetsu#Mystic Quest
pl:Final Fantasy Mystic Quest